Richard L. Sealy is a Barbadian politician who was Deputy Prime Minister and Minister of Tourism and International Transport in the Cabinet of Barbados from 23 October 2010 to 25 May 2018  He was replaced by Marsha K. Caddle. He is also the Chairperson of the Democratic Labour Party Member of the House of Assembly of Barbados for the St Michael South Central constituency.

He graduated with a BSc in Civil Engineering from the University of Florida at completed an MBA at the University of the West Indies (Cave Hill Campus).

References

1969 births
Living people
University of Florida College of Engineering alumni
University of the West Indies alumni
Members of the House of Assembly of Barbados
Government ministers of Barbados
Democratic Labour Party (Barbados) politicians